The following is a list of recurring Saturday Night Live characters and sketches introduced between October 7, 2000, and May 19, 2001, the twenty-sixth season of SNL.

Gemini's Twin
Gemini's Twin is an R&B/pop music group composed of Jonette and Britanica, created for a series of sketches on Saturday Night Live and written by SNL writer James Anderson. The sketches featured Maya Rudolph and Ana Gasteyer as members of the group that satirized Destiny's Child. The two would incorporate hip-hop slang into their conversations in inappropriate ways, often misusing intellectual words or making up new words altogether: "It's time to get musicational!" "Our music comes from a very emotionary place." It is then occasionally revealed that the band members attended elite colleges. Debuted November 4, 2000

A celebrity (often the guest host) would often appear as the current third member of the band. Such third members have included Cameron Diaz, Gwyneth Paltrow, Lucy Liu, Britney Spears, Charlize Theron and Jennifer Lopez. This was a jab at the infamous turmoil and frequent lineup changes in Destiny's Child.

In one sketch, the real members of Destiny's Child appeared as former members of Gemini's Twin who had been kicked out of the band.

Jeannie Darcy
An uninspired stand up comedian with a mullet played by Molly Shannon. At the end of each bit, Jeannie Darcy would use the catchphrase: "Don't get me started, don't even get me started." Debuted November 18, 2000.

Rap Street
Rap Street was a TV show sketch which appeared twice on Saturday Night Live in 2000. The hosts of Rap Street, Grandmaster Rap (a take-off on Grandmaster Flash played by Jerry Minor) and Kid Shazzam (Horatio Sanz) were caricatures of old school rappers who hearkened back to the early days of rap. They would often refer to their time spent in the Vietnam War, mention friends of theirs who had great-grandchildren or hip problems, and use plural forms where they didn't belong (i.e. "Vietnams", "hip-hops"). They spoke out against profanity in rap music, saying things like, "We didn't rap about givin' your man friend fellat-i-os. We rapped about good stuff, like sneakers." They would begin and end each show with a similar simplistic rap which went "Rap rap, ribbity rap rap, rip rop ribbity do!" (a send-up of "Rapper's Delight" by The Sugarhill Gang).

Grandmaster Rap and Kid Shazzam first appeared during "Weekend Update" on October 7, 2000. The first full-fledged Rap Street sketch, on November 18, 2000, featured Tom Green as MC Kevin Gustafson from Ottawa, Ontario. Episode 10 of season 26 featured Mena Suvari as Aaron Carter.

Veronica & Co.
A Molly Shannon and Chris Parnell sketch. Debuted December 9, 2000. Molly Shannon played a supermodel host, and Chris Parnell played the Times Square robot.

Jarret's Room
Jarret's Room was a recurring sketch from 2000 to 2004. It is presented as a webcast opened up on a Macintosh computer as if by the viewer. The webcast is hosted by two stoner Hampshire College students, the jovial cool guy Jarret (Jimmy Fallon) and the chubby, well-baked Gobi (Horatio Sanz). It is eventually revealed that the only person who watches the show is an Icelandic teenager, Jeorg (played by Ashton Kutcher, but Kutcher didn't play Jeorg until he first hosted in Season 28). It frequently featured Seth Meyers as DJ Jonathan Feinstein starting in season 27 (Seann William Scott/Sum-41) and ending in season 29 (Lindsay Lohan/Usher). Other Characters include Jarret's roommates, Daniel (played by Chris Parnell), who appeared in the episodes hosted by Lucy Liu and Katie Holmes; and Jeff (played by Jeff Richards), who appeared in later sketches.

The sketch benefitted greatly from the formula of Mike Myers' Wayne's World: Jarret, the always enthusiastic and childlike host (similar to Wayne), is offset by his awkward co-host; the format is all DIY and low-budget; and the guests are all friends of the host or co-host. However, in Jarret's Room, the humor was more drug-influenced (particularly focusing on marijuana), rather than influenced on rock and roll and pop culture the way Wayne's World is.

In the Kirsten Dunst/Eminem episode, Dunst played a co-ed who hosts a similar web-cam show to Jarret, also with a co-host, played by Amy Poehler. Because of these similarities, Jarret accused her of plagiarism.

In the Al Gore/Phish episode, Al Gore played a professor who reprimanded Jarrett and Gobi for being slackers while musical guest Phish appeared as themselves, also being reprimanded by the professor, who claims that they were once students of his; he asks if they were still playing their music and tells them to "get a job, you dirty hippies".

In the Matthew McConaughey/Dixie Chicks episode, the actor reprised his Dazed and Confused role of David Wooderson, who remains at Hampshire College.

The theme music to Jarret's Room is Wilco's "I'm Always In Love".

Episodes:
December 16, 2000 host: Lucy Liu as Jenna
February 24, 2001 host: Katie Holmes as Amber
October 6, 2001 host: Seann William Scott as Jason Stamper
December 8, 2001 host: Hugh Jackman as Stanley Justin
February 2, 2002 host: Britney Spears as Summer
May 11, 2002 host: Kirsten Dunst as Janet
November 16, 2002 host: Brittany Murphy as Holly
December 14, 2002 host: Al Gore as Dr. Ralph Wormly Curtis and musical guest Phish as themselves
February 8, 2003 host: Matthew McConaughey as David Wooderson
May 3, 2003 host: Ashton Kutcher as Jeorg
February 14, 2004 host: Drew Barrymore as Gobi's sister
May 1, 2004 host: Lindsay Lohan as Skylar, the student taking over Jarret's dorm after he moves out.

Season's Greetings From Saturday Night Live (Christmas is Number One)
"I Wish It Was Christmas Today" Is a musical performance by Jimmy Fallon, Horatio Sanz, Chris Kattan, and Tracy Morgan singing the praises of Christmas. Sanz played a C.F. Martin & Company backpacker guitar and sang, Fallon sporadically played a keyboard, Kattan held the keyboard, and Morgan danced in place. The song generally appeared during Christmas time, but also appeared during other holiday seasons (though, always denouncing those holidays in favor of Christmas). At one point, they are even criticized by Simon Cowell, but he relents and proceeds to join them.  The Muppets filled in for Fallon, Morgan, and Kattan once, performing the song with Sanz.  Sanz and Fallon later performed the song on Late Night with Jimmy Fallon with musical guest Julian Casablancas. The original lineup for the sketch have since performed the song on The Tonight Show with Jimmy Fallon, being joined by Ariana Grande holding onto Kattan’s shoulders.

Episodes featuring "Season's Greetings"

 December 9, 2000 - 
 December 16, 2000 - 
 May 19, 2001 - 
 December 1, 2001 - 
 December 15, 2001 (sketch opens with Cheney staring into a snowglobe which then cuts to Homebase with Horatio and the rest of the guys)
 April 13, 2002 - 
 December 14, 2002 - 
 April 10, 2004 - 
 December 18, 2004 - 
 December 17, 2011 - 
 December 18, 2018 -  The Tonight Show Starring Jimmy Fallon (featuring Ariana Grande) - 

A "Summer's Greetings From Saturday Night Live" sketch never made it past dress rehearsal. This would have appeared in the May 17, 2003 episode, Kattan and Morgan's last episode as cast members, with Dan Aykroyd as the host.

Cheap Trick covered the song on their 2017 album Christmas Christmas.

Jeffrey's
Jimmy Fallon and the guest host play snooty retail workers at an upscale clothing store called Jeffrey's. Customers who approach the pair for help are greeted with hostility and snobbery, which escalates into an argument and ends with them usually leaving the store. The employees’ insults are directed at what they perceive to be the customers’ lack of style or taste, which they conclude makes them not hip enough to shop at such a high-end place. Gags were based on the absurdity of Jeffrey’s exclusivity and elitism. Fallon’s character brags he owns “Moroccan dental floss” that costs more than one customer’s entire wardrobe. The pair’s boss is an ultra-chic fashionista type played by Will Ferrell who uses high-tech gadgets like a minuscule cell phone. In the Sean Hayes episode, Fallon and Hayes break character when Ferrell rides into the store on a mobility scooter. A recurring character played by Horatio Sanz is usually the last customer to encounter the Jeffrey's salesmen and gets into a protracted insult war with the pair. Debuted February 17, 2001.

The Lovers 
Rachel Dratch and Will Ferrell play Virginia and Roger Clarvin, a couple of professors who have no scruples about discussing their sex lives. They have been seen in the hot tub of the Welshly Arms Hotel, the hotel lobby of Bear Claw Lodge, and at different locations. The skits usually begin with them introducing themselves to a guest; these conversations inevitably degenerate into the Clarvins describing the details of their sexual adventures. At the very end, Ferrell's character, Roger, typically experiences a pain in his back and exclaims "GET THE HELL OFF ME!" to his wife. A recurring character named Dave (Fallon), a traveling businessman, keeps running into the Clarvins by chance.

Appearances:
Season 26, Episode 13 (February 24, 2001): with Katie Holmes as Gail
Season 26, Episode 20 (May 19, 2001): with Christopher Walken as Walter
Season 27, Episode 3 (October 13, 2001): with Drew Barrymore as Barbara Hernandez
Season 27, Episode 11 (January 19, 2002): with Jack Black as William Mark Jaspers
Season 27, Episode 18 (April 20, 2002): with Alec Baldwin as John Wellington
Season 27, Episode 20 (May 18, 2002): with Winona Ryder as Clarissa, Dave's girlfriend
Season 28, Episode 13 (February 22, 2003): with Christopher Walken as Walter

Wake Up Wakefield!
Wake Up Wakefield! is the name of the morning announcement program for Wakefield Middle School fictionally set in San Jose, California, and broadcast from the school's A/V department, and hosted by two of its students, Megan (Maya Rudolph) and Sheldon (Rachel Dratch). The show begins with a voice over by Megan, featuring the words "Wake Up Wakefield" written on a chalkboard. Megan is a typical (if somewhat vacuous) middle school girl who has a crush on another student named Randy Goldman (Jimmy Fallon), which is borderline obsession (she wears a shirt with his likeness on it, and admits that she camps outside his house when he's sleeping). Sheldon is an awkward male nerd who always wears a polo shirt with a tie (apparently, in attempt to look like an anchorman for the program) and always addresses the audience, "Hey." Sheldon is Megan's best friend, and it is implied that he has a crush on her. Debuted March 17, 2001.

In several episodes, Megan's crush changes. (In no particular order) They range from Randy Goldman, Justin Timberlake, Clay Aiken and the infamous Adrien Brody episode, in which Megan has a photo of Brody blown up onto a T-shirt that she wears under all her clothes. It is suggested that Maya Rudolph herself had a crush on the actor and during his monologue on the show, Adrien Brody (as he walks down the stairs to the stage) runs off to make-out with Maya before starting the show.

The show serves to address current events at the school, but usually sidelines into a platform for Megan to talk about her love of Randy Goldman. Megan and Sheldon are joined on the show by "Jazz x 10", a jazz group made up of Sheldon's friends from band class. Horatio Sanz often appears as Mr. Banglian, a teacher who inadvertently stumbles onto the show, and then when he realizes they're recording, proceeds to make an "important" announcement. Mr. Banglian often attempts to relate to the students by dancing, using hip hop slang, and adding an extraneous "-izz" infix to words (e.g. "hizzouse").

The host of the particular show has appeared in each sketch.  In one sketch, Ray Romano plays Sheldon's geeky father in a dead end job. In another, Jennifer Garner plays a geeky teen with a massive crush on Sheldon. They proceed to kiss, then Sheldon has to go because of a cello lesson. Elijah Wood also appears as the trumpet player for Jazz X 10 and one of Sheldon's best friends.  Also, Senator John McCain appears as a guy in an aloha shirt named Pete Van Bleet.

Sheldon always signs off with his trademark salute (similar to Doc Severinsen's on The Tonight Show).

Jazz x 10 opens the show with a badly performed version of the song "Pick up the Pieces" by Average White Band.

References

Lists of recurring Saturday Night Live characters and sketches
Saturday Night Live in the 2000s
Saturday Night Live
Saturday Night Live